Queen Maud fromage or Queen Maud (also called Haugesund Dessert) is a dessert that predominantly consists of cream, kogel mogel and chocolate. Named after Queen Maud of Norway, daughter of King Edward VII. The dessert was developed and introduced in Haugesund municipality, and presented to Queen Maud and King Haakon during their coronation expedition in 1906, and was eventually named in honour of their visit. The dessert is commonly consumed in the western region of Norway.

See also
 List of Norwegian desserts

References

External links 
 Tine.no: Dronning Maud fromasj (Haugesunddessert)

Norwegian desserts
Dairy products
Cheese dishes